Cuterebra emasculator, the squirrel bot fly, is a species of new world skin bot fly in the family Oestridae. The species was first described by Asa Fitch in 1856.   It is an internal parasite of chipmunks and tree squirrels in the eastern United States.  The species' name comes from the belief that larvae ate the testicles of chipmunks. This belief is false, as parasitism by the larvae of these flies does not result in lower fertility - chipmunks mate in the spring, while botfly infections occur in the summer, and the larva do not impede sperm production as they reside below the skin.

References

Oestridae
Articles created by Qbugbot
Insects described in 1856
Parasites of rodents
Diptera of North America